Óscar Antonio Castellanos Santos (born 18 January 2000) is a Guatemalan professional footballer who plays for Liga Nacional club Antigua and the Guatemala national team.

He made his debut for the full Guatemalan team against Puerto Rico on the 
23 January 2021.

References

External links
 
 

2000 births
Living people
Guatemalan footballers
Guatemala international footballers
Association football defenders
Antigua GFC players
Xelajú MC players
Liga Nacional de Fútbol de Guatemala players